Wright Air Lines, founded in Cleveland, Ohio in 1966, is regarded as the first United States regional airline.  The airline was based in Cleveland at Burke Lakefront Airport and filed for protection under Chapter 11 of the Bankruptcy Code in September 1984 and its assets liquidated within a year.

History

The founder and first president of the airline was Gerald Weller.  This regional airline was the first to be financed through the sale of stock on Wall Street.

Wright was also considered a commuter airline with scheduled departures operated at one-hour intervals between cities such as Cleveland and Detroit with no advance reservations required.

During its existence, Wright Airlines had these acquisitions and mergers:

 1968 acquired Tyme Airlines
 1968 merged with Air Commuter Airlines
 1983 merged with Aeromech Airlines
After each of these mergers, the Wright name was retained.

According to its February 1, 1982, system timetable, Wright was operating Convair 600 turboprop aircraft on all of its scheduled passenger flights and was serving Cleveland Burke Lakefront Airport, Cleveland Hopkins International Airport, Cincinnati, Columbus and Dayton in Ohio; Detroit City Airport and Detroit Metropolitan Airport in Michigan; and Louisville in Kentucky.  Wright had expanded its route system by 1984 (see below) following the merger with Aeromech Airlines.

Livery

The aircraft livery of the airline varied, and through its existence was either orange and tan on white, blue and tan on white, or dark orange, orange and tan on white.

Destinations in 1984

According to its October 1, 1984 system timetable, Wright was serving the following destinations:

 Albany, NY (ALB)
 Beckley, WV (BKW)
 Bluefield/Princeton, WV (BLF)
 Clarksburg/Fairmont, WV (CKB)
 Cincinnati, OH (CVG)
 Cleveland, OH (CLE) – Cleveland Hopkins International Airport – Focus city
 Cleveland, OH (BKL) – Cleveland Burke Lakefront Airport – Home base 
 Columbus, OH (CMH)
 Dayton, OH (DAY)
 Detroit, MI (DET) – Detroit City Airport
 Detroit, MI (DTW) – Detroit Metropolitan Airport
 Elkins, WV (EVN)
 Greensboro/High Point, NC (GSO)
 Huntington/Ashland, WV (HTS)
 Louisville, KY (SDF)
 Morgantown, WV (MGW)
 Pittsburgh, PA (PIT) – Hub
 Syracuse, NY (SYR)
 Washington, DC (DCA) – Washington National Airport

Fleet
The airline flew a wide range of aircraft types at various times during its existence which were selected according to the specific route and projected number of passengers on each route:

 Beechcraft Model 18 (Twin Beech)
 Beechcraft Model 99A
 British Aircraft Corporation BAC One-Eleven (only jet type operated by the airline)
 Convair 440 "Metropolitan"  (improved version of Convair 340 with soundproofing and weather radar)
 Convair 600 (turboprop conversion of Convair 240)
 Convair 640 (turboprop conversion of Convair 340 and 440)
 De Havilland DH-114 Riley Heron
 De Havilland DH-114-2B Heron
 de Havilland Canada DHC-6 Twin Otter
 Douglas DC-3
 Embraer EMB-110P1 Bandeirante
 Short 360

Wright acquired the EMB-110P1 aircraft when it purchased Aeromech October 1, 1983.

Safety record
The airline had a good safety record with few accidents or incidents.  None are known to have been fatal accidents.

Similarly named but non-related airlines
 North-Wright Airways, a small commuter airline based in Canada.
 Wright Air Service, a small commuter airline based in Alaska.

See also
Airline call sign 
Cargo airline
ICAO airline designator
IATA airline designator
List of largest airlines
List of national airlines
List of low-cost airlines
List of defunct airlines
List of accidents and incidents on commercial airliners
 List of defunct airlines of the United States

References

Defunct airlines of the United States
Airlines established in 1966
1966 establishments in Ohio
Airlines based in Ohio